Patriot Budapest was an ice hockey club, based in Budapest, Hungary. It was founded in 2012. The club joined the Minor Hockey League, the Eurasian Minor Hockey League in the 2012–2013 season, only to withdraw early into the 2013-2014 season.

MHL Games 2012–13

September 2012

October 2012

November 2012

December 2012

January 2013

February 2013

March 2013

References

Ice hockey teams in Hungary
Ice hockey teams in Budapest
Ice hockey clubs established in 2012
Junior Hockey League (Russia) teams